The 2015 Belarusian Premier League (women) was the 25th season of women's league football under the Football Federation of Belarus.

The season was played between 19 April 2015 and 10 October 2015. FC Minsk successfully defended their title winning the league for the third year running and qualifying to the 2016–17 UEFA Women's Champions League.

League table

Results

Top scorers
As per 19 October 2015.

References

External links
Women's Football League Competition 2015 Belarus Football Federation 
Premier League Women 2015 Soccerway

 

Belarus
Belarus
2015 in Belarusian football